Admiral Philip Patton (27 October 1739 – 31 December 1815) was a Royal Navy officer.

Naval career

Educated at Kirkcaldy's grammar school, Patton joined the Royal Navy in 1755. As a junior officer he saw action at the Battle of Lagos in August 1759, the Battle of Quiberon Bay in November 1759 and the attack on Havana in June 1762. Promoted to commander in May 1778, he was given command of the bomb vessel HMS Aetna at that time and of the second-rate HMS Prince George the following year.

Promoted to captain in March 1779, he commanded Prince George at the attack on the Caracas Convoy and the Battle of Cape St. Vincent in January 1780. He was given command of the fifth-rate HMS Belle Poule in February 1781 and commanded her at the Battle of Dogger Bank in August 1781. Promoted to rear-admiral on 1 June 1795 and to vice-admiral on 1 January 1801, he became commander-in-chief Downs Station in 1803 and a Naval Lord in May 1804 before being promoted to full admiral on 4 June 1814.

References

1739 births
1815 deaths
Royal Navy admirals
British military personnel of the Fourth Anglo-Dutch War
People from Anstruther
Royal Navy personnel of the American Revolutionary War
People educated at Kirkcaldy High School
Royal Navy personnel of the Seven Years' War
Lords of the Admiralty